All The Love is the seventh album by the American vocalist, pianist and songwriter Oleta Adams and was released in 2001.

Track listing

Personnel 
 Oleta Adams – vocals, acoustic piano (9, 12)
 Peter Wolf – keyboards (1, 11), programming (1, 4, 11)
 Ricky Peterson – keyboards (2, 3, 5-8, 10), programming (2, 3, 5-8, 10), arrangements (2, 3, 5-8, 10), backing vocals (3, 5)
 Paul Peterson – programming (3, 5-10), bass (6, 10), guitars (7)
 Paul Jackson Jr. – guitars (1, 11)
 Michael Landau – guitars (2, 3, 5, 6, 8, 10)
 Stevan Pasero – guitars (2), executive producer 
 Geoff Bouchier – acoustic guitar (6)
 Larry Kimpel – bass (1, 4)
 John Cushon – drums (1, 11), percussion (1, 11)
 Gerald Albright – saxophone (1)
 Kenny Holeman – flute (6)
 Bridgette Bryant – backing vocals (1, 11)
 Sue Ann Carwell – backing vocals (1)
 Michelle Wolf – backing vocals (1, 11)
 Fred White – backing vocals (1)
 Patty Peterson – backing vocals (3, 5, 10)
 Joey Diggs – backing vocals (4)
 Jeff Pescetto – backing vocals (4)
 Debbie Duncan – backing vocals (5)
 Don Boyer – executive producer 
 Paul Erickson – engineer (1, 4, 11)
 Don Miller – engineer 
 Barry Rudolph – engineer 
 Tom Tucker – engineer
 Jeff Whitworth – engineer 
 Larry Gann – assistant engineer 
 James Harley – assistant engineer 
 Joe Lepinski – assistant engineer, digital editing 
 John Paturno – assistant engineer
 Tommy Tucker Jr. – assistant engineer 
 Bernie Grundman – mastering at Bernie Grundman Mastering (Hollywood, California)
 Todd Culberhouse – A&R 
 Tina Carson – project coordinator 
 Michael Lord – production coordinator 
 Howard Arthur – music copyist 
 Sue Tucker – music copyist 
 Digeann Cabrell – creative director 
 Ian Kawata – art direction 
 Gloria Ma – graphic design 
 Randee St. Nicholas – photography 
 Terri Apanasewicz – hair stylist, make-up
 Kelle Kutsugeras – stylist 
 Jim Morey and Chevy Nash at Morey Management Group – management 

2001 albums
Oleta Adams albums